The Ukrainian Legion of Self-Defense was a Ukrainian collaborationist formation during World War II.

References

Ukrainian Insurgent Army
1943 establishments in Europe
Ukrainian collaborators with Nazi Germany